The Yugoslavia men's national under-21 basketball team was the men's basketball team, administered by Basketball Federation of Serbia and Montenegro, that represented FR Yugoslavia (later Serbia and Montenegro) in international under-21 (under age 21) men's basketball competitions, consisted of the FIBA Under-21 World Championship (1993–2005). The event was originally referred to as the World Championship for Men '22 and Under'.

Competitive record

The FIBA Under-21 World Championship was a men's under age 21 basketball competition organized by FIBA.
FIBA has discontinued world championships for this age group.

Notes
1 – Competed as Serbia and Montenegro

The 1997 roster 
The following is the Yugoslavia roster that won the bronze medal at the 1997 World Championship:

|}
| valign="top" |
Head coach

 Assistant coaches

Legend
Club – describes lastclub before the tournament
Age – describes ageon 1 August 1997
|}

See also 
 Serbia men's national basketball team
 Serbia men's national under-20 basketball team

References

External links
 Basketball Federation of Serbia

M U21